Muriel Lake is a closed basin lake in Alberta, Canada. Although its water level has been steadily declining since 1980, this is tied to precipitation and tends to fluctuate in water level.

See also
List of lakes in Alberta

References

Municipal District of Bonnyville No. 87
Muriel Lake